Stuart D. Bogie is an American multi-instrumentalist, composer, arranger, and music producer. Originally from Evanston, Illinois, Bogie became a staple in the Brooklyn music scene.

Early years
Bogie studied music at the Interlochen Arts Academy and the University of Michigan, focusing on clarinet and bass clarinet. While in high school, he co-founded the group Transmission with Zachary Mastoon (aka Caural) in 1991. Later, Bogie would re-form Transmission with Colin Stetson, Eric Perney and Andrew Kitchen while at The U of M. After graduating in 1997, Bogie moved to San Francisco to pursue musical endeavors.

Antibalas
In 2000, Bogie moved to New York City, where he met Jordan McLean and reunited with friend and mentor Michael Herbst of Antibalas, who recruited him to join the large jazz ensemble Fire of Space, led by McLean.  Soon after, McLean and Herbst brought Bogie into Antibalas, where he functioned variously as conductor, tenor saxophonist, and composer, touring to over 15 countries and performing in major festivals around the world since.  Bogie's song "Indictment" was released on Antibalas' Who Is This America, which garnered an 8.1 from Pitchfork Media. The favorable review notes the song "opens with a Superfly-echoing riff as spastic tenor sax man Stuart Bogie recites a litany of offenses committed by everyone from Donald Rumsfeld to "the game of baseball," in what sounds like some funky People's Court." The Village Voice called "Indictment," "...a fantastic Bush-era protest song, lithe and lethal."

Another Bogie composition for Antibalas, "Beaten Metal", was named as one of the top 100 songs of 2007 by Pitchfork Media, ahead of modern-day staples by MGMT and Broken Social Scene. Pitchfork writer Grayson Currin applauded the song, noting "quick splashes of colorful sound and some slowly building drama, "Beaten Metal" sounds brazen, rhythmic, and powerful—like Edgard Varese coming of age after hip-hop."

Bogie also composed "I.C.E." and the vocal parts (lyrics and melody) for "Sanctuary", which was released (along with "Beaten Metal" on the Antibalas album Security, produced by John McEntire.  Bogie frequently conducted Antibalas between 2004 and 2012, when he formally left the group.

Fela!
Along with many members of Antibalas, Bogie appeared and performed in the Broadway musical Fela! about Fela Kuti directed by Bill T. Jones produced by Steve Hendel and Music Directed by Aaron Johnson. He performed as the featured soloist, improvising several solos throughout the show. The New York Times wrote "music that gets into your bloodstream, setting off vibrations you’ll live with for days to come."

Work with Dave Sitek
Bogie has a long history of working with producer Dave Sitek. In 2006, Bogie contributed bass harmonica, tenor sax, contra-bass clarinet to the critically acclaimed TV on the Radio album Return to Cookie Mountain, which Pitchfork Media named the #2 best album of 2006.

In 2008, Bogie was recruited to contribute tenor and baritone saxophone and collaborate on horn arrangements for TV on the Radio's Dear Science.  Following the release of the acclaimed record, Bogie toured extensively with TVOTR across Europe and North America making television appearances including The Tonight Show with Jay Leno, Late Show with David Letterman, Saturday Night Live and The Colbert Report.

Aside from contributing horns to the last two TVOTR records, Bogie also played saxophone on the Yeah Yeah Yeahs It's Blitz!, produced by Dave Sitek, where his work can be heard on "Zero", "Dragon Queen", and "Hysteric". He has also worked with Sitek on tracks by Zack de la Rocha, Holly Miranda's The Magician's Private Library, Massive Attack, Wale, Foals, Get Hustle,  Pink Noise  Telepathe and Scarlett Johansson's album of Tom Waits covers, Anywhere I Lay My Head.

Superhuman Happiness

Superhuman Happiness was founded in 2008 by Bogie and includes a long roster of artists from New York.  Eric Biondo, Andrea Diaz, Mathew Scheiner, Sam Levin, Luke O'Malley (guitar), Ryan Ferreira (guitar), Jared Samuel (keyboard), Eric Biondo (trumpet), Nikhil Yerawadekar (bass), Miles Arntzen (drums), Torbitt Schwartz, Jeremy Wilms, Ryan Sawyer, Gunnar Olsen, John Bolinger, Ian Chang, Grey McMurray, Tim Allen.

The group's first release was Fall Down Seven Times Stand Up Eight, which featured contributions from O'Malley, Biondo, Ferreira,  Brian Chase on Drums, Jeremiah Lockwood on Guitar, Jordan McLean and Eli Asher on Trumpet, Gabe Roth, Chris Vatolaro, and longtime collaborator Zak Mastoon. The self-released record was mixed by Hernan Santiago, mastered by Steve Berson and features art and design by Tatiana McCabe, and production by Bogie and Mastoon.  The single "Human Happiness" was released by Electric Cowbell on a split 7-inch with CSC Funk Band.

Through the musical Fela! Bogie's relationship with lead actor, Sahr Ngaujah, led to a collaboration between Ngaujah and Superhuman Happiness resulting in two recordings, "Gravity" and "String Theory" released on 7-inch by Electric Cowbell records.

The group's second release "The Physical EP" focused more towards lyrical songwriting and was primarily recorded at Dave Sitek's Brooklyn studio "Stay Gold" by Daniel Huron.  The record was mixed by Huron and O'Malley, and produced by Bogie and O'Malley. It was released on Royal Potato Family in 2011. The songs "GMYL" and "Hounds" were released as a 7-inch on Electric Cowbell, the songs "Needles and Pins" and "Oh, Tatiana" were released on 7-inch through Royal Potato Family.

The group's third release Hands (2013) focused on collaborative song writing, and was collectively composed through the use of clapping patterns to generate material.  The core musicians on Hands were Luke O'Malley, Ryan Ferreira, Eric Biondo, Nikhil Yerawadekar, Jared Samuel and Miles Arntzen.  The album featured lead vocal performances by several different members of the group.  The singles "See Me On My Way" and "Sentimental Pieces" were released on 7-inch.  Both the LP and 7-inch were released by Royal Potato Family. The album and 7-inch feature art by Joao Machado.  Colin Stetson, Abena Koomson, Afi McLendon, Kalmia Traver, Joci Adams, and Shaneeka Harrel also performed on the record.

The group has collaborated with video artist Tatiana McCabe on "GMYL," "Mr. Mystery," "Sentimental Pieces," "Hounds," "Needles and Pins," "Second Heart," as well as several live video collaborations.

Their latest release, Escape Velocity, was released in September 2015. AllMusic noted that the album was "Marking a new focus more than a new sound for the group, Escape Velocity's interplay of ruminative tone and unbridled infectiousness works like a charm, compelling not only moving feet but repeat plays".

The Bogie Band feat. Joe Russo 

The Bogie Band feat. Joe Russo is a new collaboration between long time friends Joe Russo and Bogie. The group features nine musicians playing wind and percussion instruments. The dynamic arrangements are built on the flowing propulsion of Russo’s drumming alternating through transcendental minimalism, raucous humor, and a revelatory joy that draws on each of the 9 musicians ability to creatively solo and contribute to the rhythmic mass of the ensemble. The group released one song, Headrush Pt. 1, and made their live debut in January 2020 at the Winter Jazz Fest in New York. Their first record,The Prophets in the City will be released on the label Royal Potato Family.

Producer
Aside from contributing to countless acts, Bogie has also produced records by Volney Litmus and Jeremiah Lockwood. In addition, he has also produced tracks for the films Lo and Behold and Invisible Girlfriend.

Awards
He has been the recipient of a Meet the Composer grant, and has written, produced and performed music for film, dance, television, and toys, for which he played alongside Elmo. Bogie also played on Angélique Kidjo's album Djin Djin, which received a Grammy for best contemporary world music album.

Notable collaborations
He has shared stage and/or studio with the Arcade Fire, Iron and Wine, Wu-Tang Clan, Medeski Martin & Wood, Public Enemy, Celebration, The Roots, Paul Simon, Harlem Shakes, Burning Spear, Zack de la Rocha, Massive Attack, Scarlett Johansson, Mark Ronson, Saul Williams, Passion Pit, Tony Allen, Sinéad O'Connor, Sharon Jones & The Dap-Kings, Joe Russo's Almost Dead, The El Michaels Affair, Baaba Maal, Bat for Lashes, DJ Logic, Brian Jackson, Yeah Yeah Yeahs, Rana, Dub is a Weapon, Congo Ashanti Roy, Kologbo, Tunde WIlliams, Ticklah, Paul Cox, Renata, Colin Stetson, Foals, Matt Bauder, Matthew Lux, Toby Summerfield, Great Lakes Myth Society, minusbaby, Crush, Kill, Destroy, Fire of Space, The Eternal Buzz Brass Band, Geoff Mann, Recloose, Evan Hause, Reverend Vince Anderson, Chin Chin, The Sharp Things, The Fu Arkist-Ra, Dick Griffin (of Sun Ra's Arkestra), Vincent Chancey, Steve Swell, Joe McGinty, Tom Abs, Shoko Nagai, Jeremy Wilms, Larry MacDonald, Butch Morris, Bill Brovold and Larval, Caural, Victor Rice, Dragons of Zynth, Loser's Lounge, State Radio, Gomez, Brightblack Morning Light, Holly Miranda, Noba, Miles Anthony Benjamin Robinson, Centralia, Wild Yaks, Oren Blowedow, Michael Leonhart and The Get Hustle.

He has also arranged strings for Spencer Day, James Harries and Ben Jonas.

Discography

References

External links
 Bogie's website

American male composers
21st-century American composers
Writers from Evanston, Illinois
Living people
University of Michigan School of Music, Theatre & Dance alumni
Musicians from Evanston, Illinois
21st-century American male musicians
Year of birth missing (living people)
Antibalas members